The Israeli Basketball Premier League Defensive Player of the Year, or Israeli Basketball Super League Defensive Player of the Year, is an award given to the best defensive player of each season of the Israeli Basketball Premier League, which is the top-tier level men's professional basketball league in Israel.

Winners

Player nationalities by national team.

References

External links
Israeli League Official website
Eurobasket.com Israeli League Page